The Primera División de Fútbol Profesional Apertura 2001 season (officially "Torneo Apertura 2001"), started on August 26, 2001, and finished on December 23, 2001.

This season saw Alianza F.C. win its 8th league title after a 2-1 victory over C.D. Luis Ángel Firpo in the final.

This was the first season that saw promotion/relegation used on a once a year basis, rather than every six months as had been a custom in previous years. This meant that teams could now only be promoted/relegated once a year, after both the Apertura and Clausura seasons had ended. At which time, the teams promoted/relegated would be decided by comparing accumulated points on aggregate over both Apertura and Clausura seasons. At this point, the bottom team would automatically be relegated to the Segunda División de Fútbol Salvadoreño, while the winner of that division would be brought up to take their spot.

Promotion and relegation
Promoted from Segunda División de Fútbol Salvadoreño as of August 26, 2001.
 A.D. Isidro Metapán

Team information

Personnel and sponsoring

Managerial changes

Before the season

During the season

League standings

Semifinals 1st Leg

Semifinals 2nd Leg

Final

List of foreign players in the league
This is a list of foreign players in Apertura 2001. The following players:
have played at least one apetura game for the respective club.
have not been capped for the El Salvador national football team on any level, independently from the birthplace

ADET
  Walter Caposuchi
  Hugo Saramiento
  Adrian Chavez

C.D. Águila
  Mariano Villegas
  Rodinei Martins
  Mauro Nunez
  Alexander Prediguer
  Dario Larrosa

Alianza F.C.
  John Carlos Serna 
  Luis Carlos Asprilla
  Jorge Sandoval
  Martin Garcia
  Edgar Montaño 
  Fránklin Cabezas 

Atletico Marte
  Andres Puig
  Roberto Clemente
  Ramon Rodriguez
  Javier Vargas 
  Paul Toro

Atletico Balboa
  Víctor Hugo Sánchez
  Franklin Webster
  Ernesto Aquino
  Carlos Villarreal

 (player released mid season)
  (player Injured mid season)
 Injury replacement player

Dragon
  Mariano Rodriguez
  Carlos Castañeda
  Fabio Zuniga
  José Fabio Caicedo
  Jahir Camero
  Luis Iseles

C.D. FAS
  Ariel Giles
  Alejandro Bentos 
  Donny Grant Zamora 
  Williams Reyes
  Pablo Quiñónez

C.D. Luis Ángel Firpo
  Diego Alvarez
  Mauricio Dos Santos
  Raul Toro
  Armando Garcia

A.D. Isidro Metapán
  Anderson Passos Batista
  Alejandro Morsche Rodríguez
  Hugo Saramiento
  Jorge Wagner
  Claudio Pasadai

Municipal Limeno
  Roberto Ramos
  Luis Alfredo Ramirez
  Gustavo Gallegos
  Raul Falero
  Didilfo Guerrero 
  Marcus Kothner

External links

Primera División de Fútbol Profesional Apertura seasons
El
1